Dyckia milagrensis is a plant species of the genus Dyckia, native to Bahia, Brazil.

References

 GBIF entry
 Encyclopedia of Life entry
 FCBS Bromeliad Species Online Database entry
 Harvard Pap. Bot. 4(1): 164–5. 1999.

milagrensis
Endemic flora of Brazil
Flora of Bahia
Garden plants of South America